Omar Moreno Palacios (5 September 1938 Chascomús, Buenos Aires – 17 February 2021, Buenos Aires) was an Argentine folk singer-songwriter, guitarist, and gaucho. He died from an encephalitis.

References 

1938 births
2021 deaths
Argentine folk singers
Argentine musicians
People from Chascomús